Whicham is a hamlet and civil parish in Copeland, Cumbria, England. At the 2011 census the parish had a population of 382. The parish includes the villages of Silecroft and Kirksanton and the hamlets of Whicham and Whitbeck. Whicham was recorded in the Domesday Book as Witingham.

It lies north of Millom on the west coast of Cumbria. The A595 road crosses it from north east to south west, near the south east border, coming from Broughton in Furness to a junction with the A5093 road, and then from south to north near the coast, towards Ravenglass and Whitehaven. The Cumbrian Coast line railway follows the coast of the parish, with a station at Silecroft. The parish absorbed Whitbeck parish on 1 April 1934.

There is a parish council, the lowest level of local government.

Listed buildings

There are ten listed buildings in the parish: all at grade II, and including two churches (St Mary's Church, Whicham and St Mary's Church, Whitbeck), a limekiln and a former brewery.

References

External links
 

 Cumbria County History Trust: Whicham (nb: provisional research only – see Talk page)

 
Hamlets in Cumbria
Civil parishes in Cumbria
Borough of Copeland